Ultan Quigley is a fictional character to whom are attributed four articles published by The Irish Times in  2008 and some more in 2009.  The character is described as an Irish poet, playwright and social philosopher born 1956.

The fictional details
According to the fictional articles, Quigley was born in Dublin and educated at Trinity College Dublin.  A controversial figure, he has always been regarded as a maverick in literary circles and has often found himself involved in feuds with fellow writers. Now resident in Wicklow, he occasionally writes newspaper columns and is currently finishing a grand narrative poem entitled Poisoning our Own Wells.

The invented books of the Ultan Quigley character

 Squatting over the Grave (1986)
 Winter Came in July (1990)
 No Tigers for the Downtrodden (Dead Badger Books, 1999)

Of course, searches of online bookstores or even the Internet in general confirm that these do not exist.

External links

Articles attributed to Quigley
(Subscription required; only the first two paragraphs are freely available)
 March 8, 2008: This time I was crying for all of us
 March 15, 2008: I would join my comrades at Parnell Square
 July 12, 2008: To be a middle-aged man in Ireland today is to be voiceless
 July 19, 2008: In the Garda station, I contemplated the irony of my situation
 May 9, 2009: 'Come back in 100 years and we'll all be wearing monocles'
 May 19, 2009: 'He exemplifies the trivial values of the new Celtophobic Ireland'

Irish columnists